Phillip Edward Gutman (January 5, 1930 – December 22, 2017) was a lawyer and politician in Indiana. A Republican, he served in the Indiana Senate from 1968 to 1976. Gutman served as President pro tempore of the Indiana Senate from 1970 to 1976.

He was a Partner in the Law Firm, Rothberg, Gallmeyer, Fruechtenicht, and Logan.

Personal life
He was married to M. Carolyn Prickett and they had three children. He served in the United States Air Force from 1952 to 1954, reaching the rank of First Lieutenant. He was a Methodist. He died on December 22, 2017.

References

1930 births
2017 deaths
Republican Party Indiana state senators